A Girl in Every Port is a 1952 comedy film directed by Chester Erskine. The film stars  Groucho Marx, Marie Wilson, and William Bendix. It was based on the short story They Sell Sailors Elephants by Frederick Hazlitt Brennan.

Plot
Benjamin Franklin 'Benny' Linn and Timothy Aloysius 'Tim' Dunnovan are two sailors assigned to the same ship.  Tim spends some inheritance money he received to purchase a race horse named Little Aaron.  Tim’s division officer considers that an ill-advised action and orders Ben to go help Tim get his money back. 
Ben and Tim go ashore to seek a return of Tim's money, but it's not a simple matter, as Tim had already hired a team to train Little Aaron.  They also discover that Little Aaron has a history of weak ankles and can't run very well.  However, they also learn that Little Aaron has an identical twin, Little Shamrock, who has good ankles and can run fast.  
Ben and Tim decide they might be able to work things out, so that they can switch the horses and make a lot of money in a horse race.  They find themselves trying to juggle the expectations of their division officer, the former owner of Little Aaron, a car hop named Miss Jane, some local mobsters, and their fellow sailors, who all want in on the action.
There’s lots of confusion leading up to the horse race, risks to the participants depending on the outcome, and some unexpected results that follow.

Cast
Groucho Marx as Benjamin Franklin 'Benny' Linn
Marie Wilson as Jane Sweet
William Bendix as Timothy Aloysius 'Tim' Dunnovan
Don DeFore as Bert Sedgwick
Gene Lockhart as 'Doc' Garvey
Dee Hartford as Millicent Temple
Hanley Stafford as Fleet Admiral Temple
Teddy Hart as 'High Life'
Percy Helton as Drive-In Manager
George E. Stone as Skeezer
This was Dee Hartford's film debut. It was through her that Groucho Marx met and later married her sister Eden Hartford.

Reception
A.W. of The New York Times wrote in his review: "The parlay of Groucho Marx, Marie Wilson, William Bendix, to say nothing of a horse-racing mix-up, the United States Navy and sabotage should have paid off in plenty of laughs. But 'A Girl in Every Port,' which breezed into the Paramount yesterday, brimming with these ingredients, is merely an involved mélange of obvious antics and gags, only one or two of which are likely to generate chuckles."

References

External links

 

1952 films
1952 comedy films
American black-and-white films
Films scored by Roy Webb
Films based on short fiction
Films directed by Chester Erskine
American comedy films
1950s English-language films
1950s American films